Connecticut's 85th House of Representatives district elects one member of the Connecticut House of Representatives. It encompasses parts of Wallingford and has been represented by Democrat Mary Mushinsky since 1981.

Recent elections

2020

2018

2016

2014

2012

References

85